The Archipelago of Sulcis (in Italian Arcipelago del Sulcis or Sulcitano) is located off the cost of Sardinia, and is part of the Province of South Sardinia.

Many of the inhabitants are descended from the Ligurian inhabitants of a Genoese coral-fishing colony established in the 16th century on the Tunisian island of Tabarka. Following the capture of Tabarka in 1741 by the Bey of Tunis they fled the island and, with the permission of Charles Emmanuel III of Sardinia, settled the islands of Sulcis. The Tabarkan settlers established the town of Carloforte on San Pietro Island and Calasetta on Sant'Antioco. The residents of these areas speak the Tabarchino dialect of the Ligurian language, which is recognized as a minority language by Sardinian regional legislation.

Geography 
It also contains several small islands: Isola Piana, Isola il Toro, Isola la Vacca, Isola del Corno and Isola dei Ratta. Of these only Isola Piana, is inhabited.

Sulcis
Geography of Sardinia
Province of South Sardinia
Islands of Sardinia